Dennis Espino (born December 20, 1973) is a Filipino retired professional basketball player in the Philippine Basketball Association. He was drafted first overall by Sta. Lucia in 1995 PBA draft.

Player Profile
Espino is known for his physical inside play and is considered is a cornerstone of the Sta. Lucia franchise. Being a Realtor since his rookie year, he has helped the team win two PBA championships. After playing under the shadows of Jun Limpot for seven years, Dennis Espino became the heart-and-soul of Sta. Lucia when his celebrated teammate was sent to Ginebra via a trade with Marlou Aquino in 2000. The former UAAP MVP showed signs that he is capable of the responsibility after braving the role as the team's go-to-guy. In 2009, after playing 14 years with the team, Sta. Lucia traded him to the Coca-Cola Tigers. In 2011, Powerade Tigers traded him to Talk 'N Text Tropang Texters.

He also played for the Philippine Centennial Team in 1998.

Arrest
In 2012, Espino was arrested by the police in Arayat, Pampanga and accused of serious illegal detention and possession of firearms. The charges arrest stemmed from a complaint by his former secretary, Mildred Eiman, who accused the player of locking her up for over a month for her failure to pay a debt amounting to P5,000. He eluded arrest for more than eight months, which according to the police was due to his political connections in Pampanga.

Coaching career
After a long and controversial absence, Espino said he is happy to be back in the game of basketball.

He showed up at PBA D-League games as one of the assistant coaches of expansion team Derulo Accelero, three years since playing his last game in the pro league where he was among its biggest stars for close to two decades.

During that absence, Espino also became a fugitive of the law and also spent time in jail for a serious illegal detention case filed by a former secretary in a piggery he put up in Mexico, Pampanga. He declined to talk about the case that led to his disappearance from the cage scene, but said he was happy to be once again involved in a sport where he first made a name as the star of the multi-titled University of Santo Tomas teams in the 90's.

References

External links
 Player Profile at PBA-Online!

1973 births
Living people
Asian Games bronze medalists for the Philippines
Asian Games medalists in basketball
Basketball players at the 1998 Asian Games
Basketball players at the 2002 Asian Games
Basketball players from Pampanga
Centers (basketball)
Philippine Basketball Association All-Stars
Philippines men's national basketball team players
Filipino men's basketball players
Power forwards (basketball)
Powerade Tigers players
Sportspeople from Angeles City
Sta. Lucia Realtors players
UST Growling Tigers basketball players
Medalists at the 1998 Asian Games
Sta. Lucia Realtors draft picks